Khandadhar Falls is located in Kendujhar district in the Indian state of Odisha.

It has a "smoke like" appearance created by the spraying of  water as it cascades down the rock face.

Location

Kahandhar is 54 km. away from Keonjhar town of Odisha.

Khandadhar Fall is located in Khandadhar Hill, one of the hills partially in Keonjhar district. On the opposite side of the hill, there is another waterfall with the same name. Khandadhar Falls, Sundagarh which is located in Banei subdivision of Sundagarh district.

References

Waterfalls of Odisha
Kendujhar district
Articles containing video clips